Que Dios me perdone (English title: May God Forgive Me), is a 1948 Mexican film produced by Cinematográfica Filmex S.A and directed by Tito Davison, starring María Félix, Fernando Soler and Julián Soler.

Plot
Lena is a sinister spy, she also manages to seduce several wealthy men only to obtain information. Meanwhile, unexplained deaths happen that only a psychologist will discover.

Cast 
María Félix as Sofía / Lena Kovach
Fernando Soler as Don Esteban Velasco
Julián Soler as Dr. Mario Colina Vázquez
Tito Junco as Ernesto Serrano
Ernesto Vilches as Medina
Carmelita González as Alicia
Fanny Schiller as Olga
José Baviera as Luigi Martino
Pepe Martínez as Jeweler
Armando Velasco as Sebastián, the butler
Nicolás Rodríguez as Martínez
Hernán Vera as Inn owner
Victorio Blanco as Bellboy
Paco Martínez as Notary public
Daniel Arroyo as Man asking Esteban (uncredited)
Fernando Casanova as Fernando (uncredited)
Gloria Lozano as Empleada hotel (uncredited)
Ignacio Peón as Transeúnte (uncredited)
Joaquín Roche as Gerente hotel (uncredited)

References

External links 

Mexican black-and-white films
Mexican drama films
1948 drama films
1948 films
1940s Mexican films